The Forgotten is an American punk rock band based in San Jose, California. The Forgotten have toured the US, Canada, Europe and Japan numerous times.

History
Singer Gordy Carbone and bassist Ken Helwig's previous band SLIP had recently broken up, coincidentally, at the same time as guitarist Craig Fairbaugh and drummer Shea Roberts' band 46 Short. The four joined forces in 1997 to form The Forgotten. The band was signed as the second band ever to TKO Records. Dave Kashka joined in 1999 on drums and Johnny "Bleachedjeans" Gregurich joined in April 2000 on bass at which point the band went full-time. They have four full-lengths and four EPs on TKO Records. The Forgotten also has releases on BYO records (CA, USA), Knockout Records (DE), Coretex Records (DE) and People Like You Records (DE), and have appeared on numerous compilation and tribute albums. The band toured heavily throughout Europe, the US and Japan from 2000 to 2003, building a loyal and growing following. Original guitarist Craig Fairbaugh left the band in late 2003 and moved to the Los Angeles area to pursue a solo music career. A longtime guitar player, bassist Johnny decided to shift over to guitar after the band became frustrated with several guitarist auditions. Jonny Manak joined on bass in 2005 for one year. Nick "Ugly" Schuneman took over permanently on bass in November 2006, at which point the current line-up has been intact since. The band has not performed live since September 2017 but are still releasing new recordings and looking to play live again someday. The last, most longstanding line-up consists of Carbone, Gregurich, Schuneman and Kashka.

The Forgotten have four full-length albums, 4 EP/LPs and two versions of a Greatest Hits compilation. Rancid's Lars Frederiksen has produced three works by The Forgotten: Class Separation EP, Veni Vidi Vici and the self-titled CD 'The Forgotten'. Carbone also plays and records with Lars Frederiksen in Lars Frederiksen & the Bastards.

The Forgotten has played shows and/or toured with Rancid, Dropkick Murphys, The Unseen, The Casualties, U.S. Bombs, GBH, Oxymoron, Agnostic Front, The Business, Madball, Cock Sparrer, Anti-Nowhere League, The Adicts, Nashville Pussy, Demented Are Go, Slayer, Anti-Heros, Bouncing Souls, Hot Water Music, Ignite, Misftis, Sham 69, Cro-Mags, Earth Crisis, U.K. Subs, One Man Army and Stiff Little Fingers.

Joe Strummer of The Clash once mentioned that The Forgotten was the best name for a punk band he'd ever heard.

Members
Current members
 Gordy Carbone – vocals (1997–present)
 Johnny "Bleachedjeans" Gregurich – guitar, backing vocals (2000–present), bass guitar (2000-2003)
 Nick "Ugly" Schuneman -  bass guitar, backing vocals (2006–present)
 Dave Kashka – drums, (1999–present)

Former members
 Craig Fairbaugh - guitar, backing vocals (1997-2003)
 Ken Helwig - bass guitar, backing vocals (1997–1999)
 Gabe Gossack - bass guitar, backing vocals (1999-2000)
 Jonny Manak - bass guitar, backing vocals (2005–2006)
 Shea Roberts - drums, (1997–1998)
 Todd Loomis - drums, (1998–1999)

Former touring musicians
 Eric Powers - drums (2011, 2014)
 Mike Fox - guitar (2004)

Timeline

Discography

Studio albums 
 Veni Vidi Vici CD/LP (1998) TKO Records
 Keep The Corpses Quiet CD/LP(2000) TKO Records
 Control Me CD/LP (2002) BYO Records
 The Forgotten CD (2008) TKO Records

EP's 
 Class Separation 7" EP (1997) TKO Records
 Picture Disc 7" EP (1999) Abusive Records
 Ask No Questions CD/10" EP (2001) Knockout Records
 The Forgotten/Heartaches split CD/LP (2003) People Like You Records

Compilation albums 
 Singles Collection CD/LP (2000) Core-Tex Records (DE)
 Out Of Print US-release of Singles Collection CD (2003) BYO Records

Covers
 "Riff Raff" AC/DC (2000 "A Punk Tribute to AC/DC" CD/LP)
 "No Room For You" Demob (2000 US Tour - present)
 "Employer's Blacklist" The Business (2001 "Hardcore Hooligan: A Tribute To The Business" CD/LP)
 "Your Generation" Generation X (2003 "The Forgotten/Heartaches Split" CD/LP)
 "I Am The Hunted" GBH (2003 "The Forgotten/Heartaches Split" CD/LP)
 "You May Be Right" Billy Joel (2005-2006 live)
 "On The Dark Side" (inside "Social Security") John Cafferty & The Beaver Brown Band (2005-2006 live)
 "Solitary Man" Neil Diamond (2005-2006 live)
 "Rock 'N' Roll Outlaw" Rose Tattoo (2006 live with Shawn Packer)
 "Knife's Edge" GBH (2008 "Self-Titled" CD)
 "Safe European Home" The Clash (2008 European Tour - present)
 "I Got Your Number" Cock Sparrer (2008 "A Tribute To Cock Sparrer" CD/LP)
 "Catastrophe" Swingin' Utters (2010 "Untitled 21: A Juvenile Tribute to the Swingin' Utters" CD/LP)
 "Corruption" Rancid (2014 "Hooligans United: Rancid Tribute Record" CD/LP)
 "I'm True" Anti-Heros (2016 live)

Concert tours
 Peter and the Test Tube Babies/The Forgotten US Tour 9/4/98-10/10/98
 "TKO Records So-Cal Invasion" California Tour - Workin' Stiffs/The Randumbs/Reducers SF/The Forgotten/Pressure Point/The Bodies 11/3/99-11/5/99
 The Business/Agnostic Front/U.S. Bombs/The Forgotten European Tour 6/17/00-7/9/00
 Blanks 77/The Forgotten/Sixer/The Krays US Tour 7/21/00-8/4/00
 Agnostic Front/Ignite/The Forgotten/Shutdown/Discipline/Stampin' Ground European Tour 11/15/00-12/10/00
 The Forgotten/Sixer European Tour 5/10/01-7/8/01
 "Pure Punk Tour" US - Oxymoron/The Forgotten/The Boils/Dead Empty 7/22/01-8/26/01
 The Forgotten US Tour 5/4/02-6/28/02
 "Chaos Across The Nation" US Tour - Youth Brigade/Oxymoron/The Forgotten/The Beltones/Pistol Grip 8/19/02-9/8/02
 The Unseen/The Forgotten/46 Short California Tour 10/10/02-10/14/02
 The Casualties/The Forgotten US Tour 11/1/02-12/15/02
 GBH/The Forgotten/Toxic Narcotic West Coast Tour 1/23/03-2/4/03
 The Unseen/The Forgotten US Tour 5/17/03-6/7/03
 The Forgotten US Tour 7/26/03-8/3/03
 F-Minus/The Forgotten/A Global Threat US Tour 8/4/03-8/11/03
 "Punk-O-Rama" Canada Tour - Bouncing Souls/Hot Water Music/The Forgotten/Worthless United 8/13/03-8/24/03
 The Forgotten/Last Target Japan Tour 10/11/03-10/19/03
 U.S. Bombs/The Forgotten California Tour 3/18/05-3/22/05
 The Forgotten/Radio Dead Ones European Tour 2/24/08-3/8/08
 The Forgotten Hawaii Tour 10/7/11-10/8/11

Festivals
 Oberwart Festival - Oberwart, Austria 6/24/00
 With Full Force Festival - Roitschora, Germany 6/25/00
 Sommerloch Festival - Limburg, Germany 7/1/00
 Fasanenhof Antifascist Festival - Stuttgart, Germany 5/19/01
 Tonne Festival - Wangen, Germany 6/9/01
 Open Air Festival - Regensburg, Germany 6/22/01
 Holidays In The Sun Festival - Morcambe, England 7/6/01
 Sjock Festival - Antwerp, Belgium 7/8/01
 Beer Olympics Festival - Atlanta, GA 7/22/01
 Holidays In The Sun Festival - San Francisco, CA 8/26/01
 Holidays In The Sun Festival - Asbury Park, NJ 9/8/02
 Punk Rock Bowling Music Festival - Las Vegas, NV 2/3/03
 Punk & Disorderly Festival - Berlin, Germany 2/24/08
 Punk Rock Bowling Music Festival - Las Vegas, NV 5/26/12
 Punk Rock Bowling Music Festival - Las Vegas, NV 5/25/14
 Insta-Fest - Long Beach, CA 9/13/14

Associated acts
 Lars Frederiksen and the Bastards - Gordy Carbone (vocals), Craig Fairbaugh (guitar)
 Transplants - Craig Fairbaugh (guitar)
 +44 - Craig Fairbaugh (guitar)
 Juliette and the Licks - Craig Fairbaugh (guitar)
 Mercy Killers - Craig Fairbaugh (vocals, guitar)
 The Casualties - Johnny Gregurich (bass, fill-in)
 The Dwarves - Nick Schuneman (guitar, fill-in)
 Swingin' Utters - Nick Schuneman (bass, guitar, fill-in)
 Re-volts - Nick Schuneman (guitar)
 (Four) Banger - Dave Kashka (drums), Johnny Gregurich (bass, guitar)
 Karate Riot - Johnny Gregurich (bass, vocals)
 CAMP FUN - Nick Schuneman (guitar, vocals)
 Teens in Trouble - Nick Schuneman (guitar, vocals)
 Bibles & Hand Grenades - Dave Kashka (drums)
 Strange Kicks - Nick Schuneman (guitar, vocals)
 Muckruckers - Nick Schuneman (guitar, vocals)
 The Vex - Johnny Gregurich (bass, fill-in)
 The Uglies - Nick Schuneman (guitar, vocals)
 Trashkannon - Nick Schuneman (guitar)
 Crack - Dave Kashka (drums)
 No One's Victim - Johnny Gregurich (bass, guitar, fill-in)
 The Frontline - Johnny Gregurich (bass)

References

External links
 

Punk rock groups from California
Musical groups from the San Francisco Bay Area
Street punk groups
Musical groups established in 1997
1997 establishments in California